The 2015 Sporting Kansas City season was the twentieth season of the team's existence in Major League Soccer and the fifth year played under the Sporting Kansas City moniker.

Due to the dissolution of Chivas USA and MLS expansion to New York and Orlando, Sporting Kansas City moved to the Western Conference. Sporting was a member of the Western Conference for its first nine seasons before moving to the Eastern Conference for the previous ten seasons.

Squad

First team roster 
As of October 13, 2015.

Player movement

In

Out

Loans

In

Out

Competitions

Match results

Preseason

Desert Friendlies

Desert Diamond Cup 

Kickoff times are in CST (UTC-06) unless shown otherwise

Major League Soccer

Western Conference standings

League table

Regular season 

Kickoff times are in CDT (UTC-05) unless shown otherwise

MLS Cup Playoffs

Bracket

Results

Knockout round

U.S. Open Cup

References 

Sporting Kansas City seasons
Sporting Kansas City
Sporting Kansas City
Sporting Kansas City
2015